Autódromo Internacional Ayrton Senna may refer to one of the following race tracks in Brazil:

 Autódromo Internacional Ayrton Senna (Caruaru) in Caruaru
 Autódromo Internacional Ayrton Senna (Goiânia) in Goiânia
 Autódromo Internacional Ayrton Senna (Londrina) in Londrina